Transcription factor TFIIA is a nuclear protein involved in the RNA polymerase II-dependent transcription of DNA.  TFIIA is one of several general (basal) transcription factors (GTFs) that are required for all transcription events that use RNA polymerase II.  Other GTFs include TFIID, a complex composed of the TATA binding protein TBP and TBP-associated factors (TAFs), as well as the factors TFIIB, TFIIE, TFIIF, and TFIIH.  Together, these factors are responsible for promoter recognition and the formation of a transcription preinitiation complex (PIC) capable of initiating RNA synthesis from a DNA template.

Functions

TFIIA interacts with the TBP subunit of TFIID and aids in the binding of TBP to TATA-box containing promoter DNA.  Interaction of TFIIA with TBP facilitates formation of and stabilizes the preinitiation complex.  Interaction of TFIIA with TBP also results in the exclusion of negative (repressive) factors that might otherwise bind to TBP and interfere with PIC formation. TFIIA also acts as a coactivator for some transcriptional activators, assisting with their ability to increase, or activate, transcription. The requirement for TFIIA in vitro transcription systems has been variable, and it can be considered either as a GTF and/or a loosely associated TAF-like coactivator.  Genetic analysis in yeast has shown that TFIIA is essential for viability.

Structure

TFIIA is a heterodimer with two subunits: one large unprocessed (subunit 1, or alpha/beta; gene name ) and one small (subunit 2, or gamma; gene name ). It was originally believed to be a heterotrimer of an alpha (p35), a beta (p19) and a gamma subunit (p12). In humans, the sizes of the encoded proteins are approximately 55 kD and 12 kD.  Both genes are present in species ranging from humans to yeast, and their protein products interact to form a complex composed of a beta barrel domain and an alpha helical bundle domain. It is the N-terminal and C-terminal regions of the large subunit that participate in interactions with the small subunit. These regions are separated by another domain whose sequence is always present in large subunits from various species but whose size varies and whose sequence is poorly conserved. A second gene encoding a large TFIIA subunit has been found in some higher eukaryotes.  This gene, ALF/TFIIAtau (gene name ) is expressed only in oocytes and spermatocytes, suggesting it has a TFIIA-like regulatory role for gene expression only in germ cells.

References

External links 
 

Gene expression
Transcription factors